Spring was a Flemish television soap made by Studio 100 for children's channel Ketnet. Six seasons were taped between 2002 and 2007 during the summer period.

Storylines

Season 1
Spring is a dance school run by Maggy Lejeune. She teaches a group of girls including Katrijn Van Asten, Evi De Bie and newcomer Chantal Goegebuer. They take a part in a dance contest; Katrijn and Chantal are competing as soloists.
Spring also plays host to the namesake band; the original members are Evert Van Bellum on guitar, Pieter Van Asten on bass, Thomas Desmyter on drums, and Xavier Lejeune (Maggy's wisecracking brother) on keyboards. Xavier proves to be unreliable, and Evert insists that he leaves the band. He's replaced by Evert's cousin Jonas who's also a successful DJ.
Things go wrong Katrijn meets her "dreamboy" Arne; they start a relationship, much to Evert's dismay because he's secretly in love with Katrijn. Arne appears to be a drug dealer with cruel intentions; Jonas, a busy man, becomes one of his clients. 
To add insult to injury, Jonas nearly breaks up the band because he starts dating Thomas' ex-girlfriend Evi. Thomas announces his departure on radio and also explains why. Al ends well, Arne is banned from Spring, Thomas rejoins the band in time for their record contract, and the girls win the contest on account of a shared solo by Katrijn and Chantal.

Season 2
Season 2 sees Pieter having a relationship with Chantal while a notorious spray painter has come to town. Jonas and Thomas have left Spring; the former has moved to Ibiza to continue his DJ career, and the latter is too busy at his father's garage. Their replacements are, respectively, keyboard player Tina "Tien" Smolders, and drummer/policeman David Vercauteren. David begins a relationship with Katrijn; although initially disheartened, Evert wishes them the best. The band also get a new manager (Luc) who may help them to record a CD and a music video. 
After year of hard work, Evi hopes to become the soloist in the forthcoming video by the popular band Fusion. They only need to pass the audition. 
Xavier and his mate Axel Dewinne have formed the band Woefer. They share their manager with Spring, but the problem is Luc and the record company cannot afford to keep them both. Spring add a female vocalist to the lineup; they choose Evi over Chantal and Katrijn.
Having split with Pieter, Chantal rebounds by pretending to be in love with Axel. She joins Woefer, but leaves as quickly once it transpires that the lyrics for their first song are stolen from Spring. To make matters worse, Evi and Katrijn are singled out as this year's soloists, and Pieter is now dating Tien.
Maggy jumps at the chance to dance in Paris; Laura takes over her lessons, but appears to be spying for Marie-France, Chantal's mother. She is paid to persuade Katrijn to give up her dancing lessons and put Chantal forward as a replacement for the solo. Maggy returns in time to prevent this scenario.
Meanwhile, Xavier and Abel found out that Tien is responsible for the spray paintings, and use this to blackmail Spring; they threaten to tell all to the police if the band do not give Woefer their latest song. Spring make the right decision by going to the police themselves; Axel get arrested for not paying his traffic fines, and the days of Woefer end before they even begun. The manager has good news for Spring; he gives them the opportunity to record a CD and a music video. The girls have passed the audition and dance in Fusion's new video.

Season 3
Everyone is busy pursuing their own projects; Evi has given up her dreadlocks and her dancing shoes to study Eastern philosophy in London, Maggy spends a few days in Paris, Katrijn wants to be a professional dancer while Evert wants to continue as a singer-songwriter. Pieter is taking up the art of motorbiking, and Tien is taking driving lessons. Their individual dreams seem to fall apart when Roger, Katrijn's policeman father, tells them that Maggy died in a car accident on the way home. After Maggy's cremation, everyone agrees that she'd wanted them to fulfill their ambitions.
Xavier inherits money from Maggy; he buys himself a new guitar and an amplifier, and joins the popular death metal band Black Slash. They only accept him as a full member if he applies a tattoo as well, something that he is not made for. He falls in love with the new girl in Spring, Roxanne Boisier; she is not fond of tattoos either, and Xavier happily abandons Black Slash.
Manager Luc tells Spring that he found a venue where they can tape their anniversary concert. Roxanne can prove on television that she is a great dancer.
A tropical party is held at Spring; Xavier and Roxanne amaze the others by kissing, but the party is only spoiled when a notary announces that Spring will be sold.
Another thing that concerns the boys and girls of Spring is Arne's return; he is at the basketball yard and has an appointment with Katrijn. Arne tells that he changed his ways and that he only has good intentions; Roger confirms this. Xavier wants to take Roxanne to Thailand and buys scratch cards in order to win the money for the trip. At the auction, Spring is temporarily sold to Marie-France, but she wants to convert it into a photo studio. Xavier wins the lottery, but uses the money to buy Spring; by joining forces with new dance teacher Pia, he manages to outbid Marie-France and continue his sister's dream.
The manager has taken Spring's music to London in an attempt to launch their career in the United Kingdom. All remains quiet till Evert hears an English version of Spring's theme song on the radio; he realises that Luc has sold their music.
Pieter leaves the band to become a test driver in Australia, and thus travel the world. He asks Jo De Klein, an artist by day, to take his place and is treated to a farewell party.
Chantal's expatriate father Christian pays a visit to Belgium; he asks his daughter to go back with him to Canada. Chantal is unsure and chooses to stay in Belgium, which her father fully understands.
A film director wants to tape a docusoap on Spring; Pia thinks it's a good idea because it will give her dance school free publicity. Jo gets the band a new manager; one who confuses Evert by persuading him to go solo. Evert turns down the offer and stays with Spring. In her jealousy, Roxanne competes with Katrijn for the solo spot. 
Luc Cortens returns to Spring in an attempt to cut a deal with Xavier; Spring's latest songs for a large sum of money. Xavier is not to be bribed and hands Luc over to the police.
Jo gets evicted from his apartment; Arlette, Katrijn's mother, suggests that he moves in at Pieter's bedroom. Spring finally manage to find a venue for their anniversary concert; Pieter briefly returns for a surprise appearance with the band.

Season 4
Summer 2005; Pia is on holiday and unsuccessfully orders Xavier to paint her office. Instead he is staging extra courses to make Spring more viable. His guitar class draws enough interest to add a second one. Evert, short of money to finance his Rock Academy stint, is keen to take part of the load but Xavier isn't having any of it. The second lesson turns out to be the last; Evert attends as a paying student to give the joker a mouthful.
Katrijn passes her first year as a ballet dancer. Everyone is pleased for her except Roxeanne; despite modelling for Marie-France she's still gutted with not being chosen as the face of Spring. When Roger and Arlette offer their daughter a trip for two to London, Katrijn makes a surprise announcement: she has quit ballet class because there are too many egos and not enough friends. Roger retaliates by treating her as a tenant; even charged for the most futile of all things. Katrijn walks out and moves in with Jo (who also escaped Roger's moanabouts). As her ego gets the better she quits dancing altogether and starts drinking.
Xavier is further humiliated by teaching junior ballet dancers and getting captured on videocam. He retaliates by cancelling the subsequent lesson in favour of the American football club's rifle. Roxanne finds out that a car is to be won and in her greediness she insists that Xavier cheats the draw in her advantage or else their love relation is over. The team captain wins but gives his ticket, and therefore the car, to Xavier. Fully aware that losing Xavier means losing access to his car, Roxanne puts all her effort to win him back (staging a belly dance act for a start). From now on they have an on-off relationship. Meanwhile, Pia returns and reprimands Xavier for not painting her office and cancelling the ballet class. The little girls appear to be fond of "Miss Xavier" and get their annulled lesson rescheduled.
Previously struggling to find a job, Tien becomes a mechanic and test driver. She challenges Katrijn, Xavier and Pia for a racing match; Katrijn wins and invites everyone to celebrate at her place (Jo: "My place, that is"). She behaves badly and joins forces with Xavier, number last in the race; together they resume the party at the ballet room where they also spend the night. Wrong timing; Pia's theatre-owning Dad arrives to cast a critical eye on his daughter's efforts. Nursing a hangover, Katrijn regrets her actions but it is too late; her bags are packed. Having no one left to turn to, she goes back home undoing the damage caused.
David stages a martial arts class at Spring and takes up as a private investigator trainee. Roger is not happy with this move, let alone with his wife's new career as ombudsman. He walks out after one argument too many and moves in with Jo, probably thinking that the poor guy runs a Van Asten refuge. Roger claims that Arlette chucked him out and insists that she'll have to beg him to come home. To cap it all, Jo's spider Marie has to move out and goes missing at the dance school. Roger eventually goes the same way as Katrijn; he apologises for his behaviour and promises to give David the much-needed advice.
Marie-France, left to her own devices after firing her assistant Claude, gets plagued by cockroaches. She's too proud to call for help and tries to fix the problem herself to no avail. Marie-France finally succumbs, but fearing for her reputation she insists that the van is parked somewhere else. Christian returns from Canada and introduces fellow ex-pat Roland and his son Bas. Chantal is initially unimpressed with the latter's geeky looks but soon they get on pretty well.
Evert digs his own grave by telling Xavier's newsagent dad Francois a thing or two about the pizza business. This inspires him to set up his own pizza restaurant; he persuades Xavier to give up his Spring co-ownership and join him as a business partner. Roxanne is furious. When Spring and Chantal record a jingle for a pizza commercial ("Mamma mia, what a pizza") Xavier pips them at the post by copying it and handing it over to the radio station pretending to be Evert. Scheduled to perform at the Pizza Francois' launch party Spring seek revenge by closing off with "the original version of the commercial". Another party spoiler; Marie resurfaces and passes away. Struck by guilt, Roger buys Jo a snake as a replacement pet.
With her Dad arriving at the wrong time again (Tien is dismantling a car at the ballet room as part of a bet) Pia is put on a mission to let the girls perform Swan Lake at the start of the forthcoming season. This doesn't turn out to be the easiest of all tasks and Pia decides to put the fun back into the dancing. She asks the band to score the music.
Arlette's sister's son Jorre spends the summer holiday with the Van Astens and feels bored. So he decides to frame Katrijn for stealing girlie magazines from Francois' newsagent and 20 euros from Roger's purse. Assisting Xavier as a junior bartender he also taps the counter. Once Katrijn forces him to come clean Jorre is immediately sent back.
The war of pizzas has now officially begun; Evert thinks that a two-for-the-price-of-one advert for the weekend will be a loss-making exercise for Pizza Francois. Wrong; it only leads to an increase in popularity. In order to win back customers he launches a one-week offer of two-for-the-price-of-one ... plus a free soft drink. Xavier retaliates by placing an order from a nonexistent address. Francois thinks that the joke has run its course; and right he is cause his chef has gone back to Pizza Carlo.
Xavier takes the cheating routine further when challenged into a painting contest. He puts his signature on an example made by his teacher Ben who appears to be Jo's ex-boyfriend. Too much information, mate.
Christian is voted Canadian businessman of the year. Everyone is in a celebratory mood till it transpires that the bridge that was built under his supervision has collapsed. Christian gets the blame and returns as an arrested man to Belgium where the press are euphoric. Worse yet, Marie-France refuses to visit him in case she's losing customers. Roland turns out to be the culpable one. Christian decides to stay and reconciles with Marie-France.
Evert sets eyes on David's new colleague Kareema, but there's still no end to the pizza war, certainly not after finding out that Katrijn is baking for the enemy. Now only listening to the voice inside his head Evert persuades Tien to turn up his motorbike; he ends up in hospital and is charged for crashing a bus shelter. Xavier takes half of the fine and Tien is sentenced to speeding down motorbikes because of her accomplishment.
Evert doesn't seem to have fully recovered his spirits after his accident, as he places a bottle of paint diluter at Francois' place hoping that its bad smell will put off customers. Instead the place is set alight when Xavier is there. David and Kareema are on duty and when the bottom of the bottle unveils 'Spring' they end up arresting Evert on suspicion of committing arson. He turns out to be innocent; Francois confesses that he wanted to fool the insurance company after the pizza hut lost money.
The American Football players see their place shut down because of its poor state. In the meantime they're given access to the Spring site. Xavier joins them to detract his mind from the arson.
Roxeanne refuses to model as a mechanic for a campaign to make men's jobs attractive to girls. Tien steps in and gets herself a second job in Milan with Roxeanne. She feels guilty for letting her friends down, and then Katrijn phones her to tell that Swan Lake is about to be aborted because there are too many solo projects going round. Tien doesn't think twice about going back home, much to Roxeanne's anger ("Now I'll never get an international feature"). Marie-France holds Pia responsible ("Manipulating my models because you need them so badly for your poxy Swan Lake") and threatens legal action if she doesn't get any answers.
Come the big day and Spring perform Swan Lake with the band performing their greatest hits. Xavier makes a guest appearance. Pia's Dad is far from amused, but the Minister of Culture is. ("It's about time you started to experiment") and grants the theatre its financial boost.

Season 5a
The first half of season 5 ran from January till March 2007.

Summer 2006; Chantal left the dance school and is replaced by Pia's niece Leen. Xavier sets his eyes on her and has drilled a hole in the bathroom. Leen and Katrijn get a text message from David and seek revenge. Xavier, ending up with shampoo in his eye, tries to get his own back but faces the wrath of a less likely opponent.
Roxeanne seeks distance from the other dancers and works as an online teacher for Power.com, run by Pia's other niece Stefanie (who more or less steps in Marie-France's shoes).
Jo, who devotes his spare time to boxing, is sidelined by his parents because he failed graduation; unless he passes his re-exams he no longer plays with Spring. Evert, worried that Spring will fall apart, puts more pressure on him; if Jo doesn't prepare now he'll be definitely out of the band. Struggling to get things right Jo resorts to buying the answers. The deal is captured on film meaning that he has to repay charges to keep the pictures unexposed. Jo, who passed by answering different questions, isn't having any of it and calls the police.
Tien's computer addiction catches up with her; she gets run down by a car and ends up with a bruised backside whilst her computer game is reduced to a jigsaw puzzle. Tien is furious when she finds out that the same person who brought her to hospital (Niek) did this to her. To make matters worse, she's fined for neglecting the traffic rules.
David proposes to Katrijn but she turns him down because she has a once-in-a-lifetime offer to study in the US. 
Roger meets a girl (Emma) who bears a striking resemblance to Katrijn. In fact, she's his daughter from a previous relation.
Spring open for one-time Idols contestant Brahim, who's unable to perform after breaking his neck. With cancellation not an option they fulfill the difficult task of entertaining a non-Spring audience.
Nele, who works as a messenger, is asked to join the girls and pretends she comes from a rich family living in a mansion. Roxeanne turns down an offer to replace Katrijn as auditioner for Dans Mondial, but soon changes her mind; she beats both Leen and Nele at the post, but Stefanie reminds her of her contractual obligations.
Evert launches the online Radio Spring and cuts a deal with Power.com. They become front-page news but for all the wrong reasons: their unintended debut is cut short by a police raid. It turns out that Stefanie did all this to them, including the disappearance of the unsigned license papers. Evert swears revenge.
Fed up with Roxeanne's comments, Nele decided to teach her a lesson and joins forces with Evert. They let Roxeanne wear a tracksuit advertising Radio Spring, for which she gets fired.
 Evert announces on Radio Spring that Power.com is giving away ten bicycles and manages to draw more viewers/listeners. His next move is inviting Latin pop singer Belle Perez for an acoustic session. Stefanie immediately regrets her deal.
 There's no love lost between Pia and her elder sister Liesbeth; Leen is fed up with their childish behaviour and locks them up till they've settled their differences.
 Niek and Tien find each other again on Power.com's dating site. Therefore, they are singled out to win 2500 euros and spend four days in the online room where they're subjected to Big Brother-style challenges. They lose after Niek gets confronted with his ex-girlfriend; not wanting to choose between her and Tien, he walks out.
 Evert wants to miss nothing of the event and sacrifices his relationship with Karima, particularly after accepting an invitation to meet a faithful listener who kept sending him text messages. Rita is anything but the blonde bombshell that Evert expected to see; she insists on going out for dinner.
 Emma is thrown out and takes over Jo's flat. Karima moves in with her while her place gets a makeover.
 A guy called Joost rents space at the dance school. He's burning CDs and gives Evert the latest hits for 'Radio Spring' if he promises to keep his mouth shut. Stefanie assumes that he's got another sponsor (and therefore breaching his contract) and phones to the studio for answers. Evert humiliates her by sharing this conversation with all his listeners. Confronted with this, Stefanie swears revenge and she's not the only one.
 Joost is not happy with the fact that 'Radio Spring' gives away free CDs and sabotages the broadcast. Evert successfully sets up a boobytrap but he can't press charges cause he'll be dragged along if Joost goes down. With lying to Karima not an option, Evert decides to tell the truth. Joost knocks him down and puts him on the back seat of a soon-to-be-demolished car. David and Karima arrive in time to save him.
 Roxeanne rejoins the crew after apologising for her rude behaviour. Unfortunately though, she has to share the next solo with Steven, Spring's first male dancer. To cap it all, he appears to be the same guy who gave her a shower of paint at a fur shoot.
 Evert also has some apologies to make after the confiscation of Joost's CD's. The listeners forgive him and send him all their legal stuff.
 Xavier thinks that Steven is gay but changes his tune after being taken for a flight.
 Emma falls out with Karima over an undelivered love letter to David; entering a food store she's taken hostage. Everyone watches the online coverage, except Roxeanne who has bigger concerns on her mind (polishing her fingernails for example).
 Roger is brought to hospital after suffering a heart attack. It was his plan to sell homemade wafers to finance the skateboards he bought for street kids. The girls and boys of Spring step in to make it happen. Only Roxeanne manages to put off one customer by telling her that the wafers are a greasy source of diarrhoea.
 Roxeanne and Steven are forced to practise the tango, otherwise they both face ejection. Roxeanne seeks the opportunity to make Leen jealous.
 Tien accepts a lift from two guys; their red van matches the on-radio description of a getaway car used by escaped prisoners. She wastes no time in phoning the police, but the guys appear to be masons.
Awakened from his coma, Roger remarries Arlette. Spring are the live band, Katrijn flies over as special guest, and Xavier stages a prank; he sends the couple a box of mice.
Prank-time continues; the band members decide to teach Supercop David a lesson; they lure him to an abandoned place (the so-called location of a wedding gig) and scare the hell out of him. Xavier and Jorre step in at 'Radio Spring'; they get bored and lighten things up by announcing a bomb scare. Consequently, they spend the night behind bars.

Season 5b
The second half of season 5 began on 15 November 2007.

Another new face joins the crew; Xavier takes a shine to Annick and tries to impress her by 'borrowing' Liesbeth's flash car. He brings it back in a damaged state but only gets a fair warning; instead Stefanie is held responsible because she neglected to take the keys out.
It transpires that Annick once became Miss Diamond by covering the soles of Roxeanne's shoes in Vaseline. And now that they're linked to each other for the next performance Annick is more than happy to reprise this stunt. However, the truth comes out after Jo finds the jar in her bag. Annick will never dance in Spring again.
After their embarrassing duck-out of the bungee jump, Evert, David and Jo compete for the title of Mr. Spring. One of the challenges is entertaining a Little Miss Hard-to-Please for 30 minutes. Jo becomes Mr. Spring because he didn't resort to bribing the judges (Tien and Emma).
Power.com launches a love-themed chat store where a certain Angel supplies strong-minded answers. Thanks to Stefanie spreading breakup rumours, Angel appears to be Steven and consequently loses his job; he gets a slot at 'Radio Spring'.
Niek gets chased by three bullies who offer protection for 50 Euro and a free car wash. They keep raising charges at recurring visits. Niek tries to keep up appearances but by giving them out-of-sync explanations Tien and Evert discover the truth. Together they set up a booby trap.
'Radio Spring' stages a talent contest which Evert is determined to win himself. During the first selection round he faces stiff competition from Niek, Xavier and a mysterious cowboy who gets insult after insult. It appears to be Jo in disguise. They end up as finalists but thanks to blind technician Stijn the listeners vote for Emma.
The girls turn down an offer from the Society Club to dance as clowns, but when it transpires that Pia might accept a new job abroad they have a change of heart and do everything not to lose their teacher. The clown's act is a success and Pia appears to have no plans to leave. In fact, the letter that Leen was never allowed to read was addressed to a one-time pupil who dropped by to say thanks.
Delivering a parcel, Nele discovers that Ladicom, who sponsor Power.com, are guilty of vivisection. Together with Steven, Leen and Jo (pursuing a holiday job as security guard) she rescues the mice. They also manage to extract an on-the-record confession.
Niek takes part in an airbrush contest. He wins,(but no) thanks to his predecessor who won three times in a row.
Xavier has a crush on French dancer Celine. Problem though is that he doesn't speak the language ("My worst subject at school"). David passes the right sentences through a microphone; everything works out fine till an interfering Evert puts on his prank hat. Xavier tries to make amends and even uses a Dutch-to-French dictionary to write a letter. Too late; Celine has returned to Paris but she sends him a reply.
The band perform at a wedding. The bride appears to be Evert's ex-girlfriend from his pre-Spring days. Evert still has feelings for Lien and not wanting to lose her for good he manages to prevents her from going for the old married-in-haste-repent-at-leisure-routine.
The girls audition for an online commercial for Power.com's new sponsor, but lose out to Roxeanne. It appears to be a dog food commercial.
Tien and Niek learn that they've been painting stolen cars. They search for the thieves and end up taken in hostage. Jorre follows suit. Thanks to an overlooked mobile phone they manage to escape.
Karima gets subjected to racist bullying and insists on leaving the country. Spring organise a march against intolerance and a phone-in, which are almost wasted efforts; Roger successfully persuades Karima to stay and make a stand like a real cop. Brahim records an anti-racism track with the boys and girls from Spring.

Season 6
January 2008; Pia is late; in fact, she doesn't turn up at all. Only her mobile phone is present. During her second phone call Pia explains that she made a last-minute trip to New York as a stand-in dancer. Liesbeth replaces her sister returns but Roxeanne disapproves, she wants a young female who knows how to teach rather than someone who makes a show of herself. But when Liesbeth offers her money for keeping up appearances she doesn't say no.
Following an argument with Tien in Spain Niek returns as a single man. Jo, David and Evert cheer him up by staging a boys-only party at the garage. The girls find out and dress up in Roger's castoffs (Roxeanne: "So yesterday") to attend.
Stefanie has a business meeting at a cafe with Renee Doornbosch; she blows it by telling off the waiter and mistaking Renee for a secretary. In other words, the deal is off.
Jo takes Emma to boxing class where the latter takes up too much interest from his teacher Koen whom he fancies. The good news though is that he just wants to explore her talents. The bad news is that Koen's already got a boyfriend.
Seeing his new love song dismissed as "not Spring enough", Evert decides to go solo. Jo takes over the vocals while Niek is drafted in on guitar. However, writing songs is another matter so Evert helps them out.
Emma sees that Nele and Niek are made for each other and embarks on a matchmaker trip. She persuades David to help her out. It all backfires as both Niek and Nele go off her; Emma apologises on radio but finds herself exposed to critical slamming including from Niek. Jo suggests to fight it out on the set of the video for Spring's new song Ik Boks Door Het Leven (I Fight My Way Through Life); Niek then admits that he only wanted to teach Emma a lesson and accidentally knocks her down.
Ego problems are Stefanie's; she puts herself in charge of solving the financial chaos that Pia left behind. Stefanie wants to turn Spring into a professional dance school but she's hiding behind a crumbling wall of lies; recruiting male dancers while she's looking for a male teacher and will that fabled performance ever see the light of day ? Juan is willing to do teaching experience but the affordable fees don't add up. In order to cough up the money Stefanie sets rules about bike parking and consuming drinks. Steven threatens to walk out for good. Leen is forced to choose between her love and Spring. Eventually no one leaves except Evert who commits himself to a series of workshops staged by producer Jean Carbonez. Roxeanne smells opportunity but ends up dismissing him as a pervert.
Nele is deadly convinced that Juan is going to be her lover but he is well aware of his responsibilities. Instead she joins forces with Leen to host a new radio show, 'Seekers Finders'; one of the callers, Luc, is looking for a new place to shelter the inhabitants of the pet asylum.
A man turns up who appears to be David's grandad. Magic Ferdinand lost his job at the circus because he has Alzheimer's disease which is hard for him to accept. He dies after his farewell show.
Niek discovers that his own Dad bought the asylum's new site for business interests; Nicholas Senior is willing to succumb if Niek does his advertising bit.
The tribute show for Ferdinand also serves as a fundraiser for the asylum. Evert collaborates as guitar-playing clown and Pia makes a surprise return.

Topstars; Dutch remake
Click here for main article.

Later developments
Jelle Cleymans (Evert) played the starring role in a stage-adaptation of The Adventures of Tintin Prisoners of the Sun during the last Spring-season. He also appeared in the Thuis-soap series. 
Kobe Van Herwegen (David) became a Ketnet-presenter (Ketnet-wrapper) which gave him the opportunity to express his magician-skills.
Veronique Leysen (Roxanne) went on to play in the amazone-themed Studio 100 production Amika; Marie-Claire, ringleader of the three-piece Z-Girls, was basically a continuation of Roxanne. Leysen had also been a Ketner-wrapper.
Timo Descamps (Jo) played a South African emigre in Dutch school-series Spangas and had a role in the US movie Judas Kiss.

Flemish television shows
Belgian children's television shows
Belgian music television shows
Belgian drama television shows
2000s Belgian television series
2002 Belgian television series debuts
2008 Belgian television series endings
Television shows set in Belgium
Television shows adapted into comics
Ketnet original programming